Cocaine 80's was an American hip hop collective founded in 2011, by record producer No I.D. With James Fauntleroy serving as lead singer on each song, the group has collectively released four full-length projects: The Pursuit EP (2011), Ghost Lady EP (2011), Express OG EP (2012) and The Flower of Life (2013).

History
On June 22, 2011, an extended play (EP) titled Cocaine 80s: The Pursuit, surfaced online. The Pursuit EP features vocals from Steve Wyreman, Rob Kinelski, Kevin Randolph, James Fauntleroy, Makeba Riddick and more. On October 21, 2011, another EP was released, titled Cocaine 80s: Ghost Lady. In December 2011, Chicago-bred rapper Common released his ninth album, The Dreamer/The Believer. The album was produced entirely by No I.D. and features additional vocal from Makeba Riddick and James Fauntleroy, on several tracks. In October 2012, Jhené Aiko revealed to The Singers Room that she is recording a project with No I.D. and the rest of Cocaine 80s and that they would also be featured on her upcoming Def Jam debut, Souled Out: "Me and the Cocaine 80s is made up of musicians, singers and producers. I told them I wanted to be a part of the Cocaine 80s. I wanted to be the female voice of the group. They will be featured on 'Souled Out'. Yes, we are definitely working on a mixtape or album together. That is definitely in the works." In June 2014, "To Love & Die", the first single from Aiko's debut album was released, which credits Cocaine 80s as the featured performers.

Discography

EPs
Cocaine 80s: The Pursuit  (2011)
Track listing
 "Nameless"
 "Summer Madness"
 "To Tell You the Truth"
 "Get You Some"
 "Not No More"
 "Nothing"
 "Anywhere but Here"
 "Like a Fool (Birdsong)"

Cocaine 80s: Ghost Lady (2011)
Track listing
 "The Fall"
 "Six Feet Over"
 "Missing Me from Heaven"
 "Not No More (Part II)"
 "Tomorrow"
 "Loved to Death"
 "The Legend of the Heart"

Cocaine 80s: Express OG  (2012)
Track listing
 "Queen to Be"
 "Take My Keys"
 "This Can't Be a Crime"
 "Chain Glow"
 "Unchain Me / Love 3x"
 "Motivation"

Cocaine 80's: The Flower of Life  (2013)
Track listing
 "Kuro to Shiro"
 "The Distant River"
 "Ground"
 "The Sun and the Moon"
 "Fly Ass Pisces"
 "Higher Self"
 "Lucid"

Singles

Guest appearances

References

American hip hop groups
Hip hop collectives
Musical groups established in 2011
Alternative hip hop groups
American supergroups
Hip hop supergroups
2011 establishments in Illinois
Musical groups disestablished in 2014